Schede may refer to:

 Schede (river), of Lower Saxony, Germany

People with that surname
 Max Schede (1844–1902), German surgeon
 Paulus Melissus (1539–1602), also Paul Schede, humanist Neo-Latin writer, translator and composer
 Wolfgang Martin Schede (1898–1975), German writer, choreographer and photographer